Naseem Khan (born 5 July 1958) is a sailor from Pakistan, who represented his country at the 1984 Summer Olympics in Los Angeles, United States as crew member in the Soling. With helmsman Khalid Akhtar and fellow crew member Adnan Yousoof they took the 20th place.

References

Living people
1958 births
Sailors at the 1984 Summer Olympics – Soling
Olympic sailors of Pakistan
Pakistani male sailors (sport)
20th-century Pakistani people